Apple Inc. manufactures most of its products in China through partners like Foxconn. Apple's decision to outsource its manufacturing has received significant criticism, due to allegations of poor working conditions, long work hours, and other labor rights violations. In response, Apple launched its Supplier Responsibility program, which aimed to improve Apple's oversight of supplier partners and enforce its ethics policies.

Several product leaks have come from Apple's supply chain rather than its corporate offices, leading Apple to reinforce its secrecy measures.

Overview 
Many reports allege that sweatshop conditions existed in factories in China, where the contract manufacturers, Foxconn and Inventec, operate the factories that produce the iPod. One iPod factory, as an example, employed over 200,000 workers who lived and worked in the factory, and regularly performed more than 60 hours of labor per week. The article also reported that workers made around US$100 per month and were required to live on the premises and pay for rent and food from the company. Living expenses—a requirement of keeping the job—typically required that employees spend a little over half of their earnings. The article also said that workers were given buckets to wash their clothes in.

Immediately after the allegation, Apple launched an investigation and worked with their manufacturers to ensure that conditions were acceptable by its standards. In 2007, Apple started yearly audits of the labor conditions of all its suppliers, slowly raising standards and severing relationships with suppliers that did not comply—yearly progress reports have also been published since 2008.

In 2010, workers in China planned to sue iPhone contractors over poisoning from a cleaner used to clean LCD screens. One worker claimed that they were not informed of possible occupational illnesses.

A 2014 BBC investigation found excessive hours and other problems persisted, despite Apple's promise to reform factory practice after the 2010 Foxconn suicides. The Pegatron factory was once again the subject of review, as reporters gained access to the working conditions inside through recruitment as employees. While the BBC maintained that the experiences of its reporters showed that labor violations were continuing since 2010, Apple publicly disagreed with the BBC and stated: "We are aware of no other company doing as much as Apple to ensure fair and safe working conditions".

In the period following these exposures, Apple has continued to receive criticism for its labor rights record. Reports in 2015 and 2016 from the labor rights organization, China Labor Watch, noted that Apple's supplier Pegatron's wages were too low to cover living costs by themselves, forcing workers to put in excessive amounts of overtime hours in order to make ends meet.

In February 2020, a report by the Australian Strategic Policy Institute listed Apple as a company that was "potentially directly or indirectly benefiting" from forced Uyghur labor. In 2020, Apple lobbyists tried to weaken the Uyghur Forced Labor Prevention Act, a U.S. bill against forced labor in Xinjiang, China.

Foxconn 

Apple's considerable commercial success is partly attributable to the outsourcing of its consumer electronics production to Asia. As the principal manufacturer of products and components for Apple, Taiwanese company Foxconn employed 1.4 million China-based workers in 2013. The workers are part of China's "floating population" of 200 million migrants, at the bottom of what Taiwanese tech entrepreneur Stan Shih calls "the smiling curve". Controlling the upturned edges of the smile—brand, design, and engineering on one side, and marketing, sales, and external relations on the other—is what ensures major profit margins.

Apple, Foxconn and China's workers are stakeholders in high-technology production, but relations between the three are perceived by analysts as imbalanced. Apple was able to capture 58.5 percent of the value of the iPhone, despite the fact that the manufacture of the product is entirely outsourced. Particularly notable is that labor costs in China account for the smallest share: 1.8 percent, or nearly US$10, of the US$549 retail price. While both Apple and Foxconn rely on Chinese workers to perform 12-hour working days to meet demand, the costs of Chinese labor in processing and assembly are insignificant in the overall commercial success of Apple. Other major component providers—such as Samsung and LG—captured slightly over 14 percent of the value of the iPhone, while the cost of raw materials was just over one-fifth of the total value (21.9 percent).

Wages average from $1 to $2 an hour for Foxconn workers, including overtime, and are dependent upon location—such rates are attractive by China's rural standards. Foxconn workers typically complete 50-hour work weeks and 12-hour shifts; however, work weeks of up to 100 hours are not unheard of during peak production periods. Foxconn workers typically cannot afford the iPads and iPhones they assemble.

In 2009 and 2010, the Foxconn factories at the Foxconn City industrial park in Longhua, Shenzhen, China, were heavily criticized in the press, with one source describing conditions as a "white collar prison". In 2009, Foxconn guards were videotaped beating employees.

Foxconn employee suicides 

On July 16, 2009, Sun Danyong, a Chinese factory worker employed by Foxconn, committed suicide, after reporting that he lost a prototype model for a fourth generation iPhone. Upon filing his report on July 13, Chinese media reported that his residence was searched by Foxconn employees, and that he was beaten and interrogated by his superiors—actions that are illegal under both Chinese and American law. The incident raised questions regarding Apple's secrecy policy and working conditions in their Chinese factories. An Apple spokesman told reporters that the company was "saddened by the tragic loss of this young employee." Apple's relationship with Foxconn regarding corporate security has been a continuing subject of controversy since Sun Danyong's death.

Apple policy on how it influences the corporate culture of its suppliers is presented in the "Supplier Responsibility Progress Reports" document. Holding suppliers accountable for their errors and omissions in their relationship with Apple is an area of concern Apple takes seriously. In one report, Apple stated:[our] procurement decisions take into account a facility's social responsibility performance, along with factors such as quality, cost, and timely delivery. When social responsibility performance consistently fails to meet Apple expectations, we terminate business.

Given Apple's stated policy at the time of the death, terminating relationships with such suppliers was potentially difficult without incurring huge financial losses.

Later in April 2010, four workers committed suicide in a single month in the same factory, signifying the beginning of the 2010 "Foxconn suicides" incident. By May 2010, 12 workers had committed suicide at Foxconn's operations in China - although the number of suicides was lower than the general suicide rate in China. Apple, Hewlett Packard, and other clients of Foxconn stated that they were investigating the situation. A total of 18 suicide attempts were recorded at the Foxconn facility in 2010, with 14 attempts resulting in deaths.

In response to the suicides, Foxconn substantially increased wages for its Shenzhen factory workforce, installed suicide-prevention netting, brought in Buddhist monks to conduct prayer sessions inside the factory, and asked employees to sign no-suicide pledges. Workers were also forced to sign a legally binding document guaranteeing that they and their descendants would not sue the company as a result of unexpected death, self-injury, or suicide. After the changes were implemented, it was not clear how employees who fail to abide by the terms of the new agreement will be sanctioned.

Labor force 

Foxconn's use of students and minors is part of its pursuit of low-cost, flexible labor. When the fallout of the 2010 suicides left Foxconn with a labor shortage, the Henan provincial government assisted with the breach. The province directed 100,000 vocational students to staff the Shenzhen assembly lines as "interns" (the Chinese term shixi can also mean "trainee") after providing them with nine days' notice. Students were told that those who failed to comply would not be allowed to graduate.

Interns have become a significant component of Foxconn's labor force, constituting as high as 15 percent of the workforce—or 180,000 interns company-wide—at peak times, making it the largest "internship" program in the world. Teachers have been stationed in the factory compound to monitor attendance, and some interns have been as young as 14—by the company's own admission—thereby violating Chinese laws. According to SACOM's Jenny Chan, Foxconn, and other similar manufacturers, are "covertly" using interns to avoid detection and culpability. The young people are hired through the same labor agencies that hire Foxconn's "dispatch workers", who are deprived of standard benefits and protections.

US-based China Labor Watch (CLW) investigated into conditions at three factories operated by Pegatron, which makes equipment for Apple computers and iPhones, and found that Pegatron hired children under the age of 18—the child laborers worked under the same poor conditions as adult staff. In total, 10,000 employees aged between 16 and 20 worked in crowded production rooms, performing the same tasks as adults. Some of the children were paid less, and others did not have their wages paid on time.

In 2020, The Information reported that Apple discovered on multiple occasions that one of its Chinese-suppliers, Suyin Electronics, relied on child labor, but took three years to fully cut ties with the company. Ten former members of Apple's supplier responsibility team said that Apple has been slow to cut ties with other suppliers that repeatedly violate Apple's labor policies when doing so would decrease profits.

Working conditions 
Workers who assemble iPhones, iPads, and other devices often labor under harsh conditions, according to employees inside the Foxconn plants. According to company reports and advocacy, Apple's suppliers in China have improperly disposed of hazardous waste and falsified records.

Forty-nine young workers were poisoned at the Lianjian Technology factory in Suzhou Industrial Park by the toxic chemical hexane, used to wipe clean the iPad display screens and speed up efficiency. To save money, the factory did not provide proper ventilation during the cleaning process, and workers developed neurological problems, the loss of motor function, numb limbs, and complained of constantly fainting and being overcome by a debilitating fatigue. Some of these sick workers were eventually bought off with a lump payment of 8,000 or 9,000 yuan (US$1,200–$1,400), but only after signing an agreement stating they would not bring claims against Apple or its supplier companies in the future.

An explosion in May 2011 at a Foxconn iPad factory in Chengdu, China, killed four people and injured 18. Employees worked excessive overtime—in some cases, seven days a week—and lived in crowded dorms. Some said they stand so long that their legs swell until they can hardly walk.

See also

 Apple worker organizations

References 

Apple Inc.